This is a list of episodes for the seventh season (1956–57) of the television version of The Jack Benny Program.

Episodes

References
 
 

1956 American television seasons
1957 American television seasons
Jack 07